SM U-36 was a Type 31 U-boat in the service of the Imperial German Navy of the German Empire, employed in the commerce war in World War I.

Construction
U-36 was laid down on 2 January 1913 at Germaniawerft in Kiel. She was launched on 6 June 1914 and commissioned on 14 November 1914, under the command of Kapitänleutnant Ernst Graeff. During February 1915, she carried out acceptance trials at Kiel, and was attached to the 2d Half-Flotilla in the North Sea in March.

Design
German Type U 31 submarines were double-hulled ocean-going submarines similar to Type 23 and Type 27 subs in dimensions and differed only slightly in propulsion and speed. They were considered very good high sea boats with average manoeuvrability and good surface steering.

The U-boat was armed with four  torpedo tubes, two fitted in the bow and two in the stern, and carried 6 torpedoes. Additionally U-36 was equipped in 1915 with two  Uk L/30 deck guns.
The boat's complement was 4 officers and 31 enlisted.

Service history
SM U-36s movements and operations were monitored and reported by British Naval Intelligence, better known as "Room 40". Her first war patrol was in Heligoland Bight from 29 to 30 March 1915; she reported no sinkings during this time. On 23 April, she returned to Heligoland Bight, apparently from a North Sea patrol.

She departed on 29 April, bound again for the North Sea, where she sank the 1,966-ton Danish steamer Lilian Drost on 8 May, captured the 1,241-ton Swedish steamer Björn on 10 May as a prize, while capturing and releasing the 654-ton Dutch steamer Niobe the same day.

U-36 returned to her North Sea station on 17 July. Operating off the north and northwest coast of Scotland, she sank three steamers and almost a dozen smaller vessels. On 22 July, the 3,644-ton Russian Rubonia fell victim. That same day, U-36 also attacked a group of fishing vessels west of the Orkney Islands, sinking nine small trawlers and two sailing vessels, while taking one prize. The following day, the 1,505-ton Frenchman Danae was stopped according to prize rules and sunk, and the 3,819-ton Norwegian Fimreite was sunk as well.

On the day she was sunk, U-36 intercepted and captured the American windjammer Pass of Balmaha, bearing a cargo of cotton intended for Russia and en route to Kirkwall to be inspected by British authorities. An ensign from U-36 was left aboard the windjammer to ensure her successful passage to Cuxhaven. Pass was refitted as a merchant raider and re-christened , commanded by Count Felix von Luckner, soon to become famous for her naval exploits in the Atlantic and Pacific.

Fate
U-36 was sunk in the afternoon of 24 July 1915 in combat off the coast of North Rona in the Outer Hebrides with the British Q-ship , commanded by Lieutenant Mark Wardlaw, Royal Navy. The submarine had just stopped and boarded the Danish vessel SS Luise and a boarding party was in the process of dumping her cargo when a lookout sighted an approaching steamer. U-36 sailed towards the disguised Prince Charles and ordered her to stop while firing at her. The Q-ship complied, swinging out her boats. Taken completely by surprise, U-36 took several direct hits and heavy damage, and sank. When Luise moved to pick up the survivors floating in the water, Prince Charles fired into her, believing her to be a German resupply vessel. Forty-five minutes after U-36 sank, the remaining survivors were picked up by the Q-ship. Kptlt. Graeff and 15 crewmen were saved, but 18 others were lost. U-36 was the first U-boat sunk by Q-ship, and one of only a handful to fall victim. Lieutenant Wardlaw received a Distinguished Service Order for the action, and two of his crew received Distinguished Service Medals. The merchant crew of the Q-ship was awarded a prize sum of £1,000, to be divided amongst themselves.

Summary of raiding history

See also
Room 40

Notes

Citiations

Bibliography

 Fitzsimons, Bernard, ed. The Illustrated Encyclopedia of 20th Century Weapons and Warfare, "U-Boats (1905–18), Volume 23, p. 2534. London: Phoebus Publishing, 1978.
*
Bodo Herzog: Deutsche U-Boote 1906-1966. Manfred Pawlak Verlags GmbH, Herrschingen 1990, 
Paul Kemp: Die deutschen und österreichischen U-Boot Verluste in beiden Weltkriegen. Urbes Verlag Hans Jürgen Hansen, Gräfelfing vor München 1998,

External links
 Information on British Q-ships like Prince Charles.

A 44 min. film from 1917 about a cruise of the German submarine U-35. A German propaganda film without dead or wounded; many details about submarine warfare in World War I.
Room 40:  original documents, photos and maps about World War I German submarine warfare and British Room 40 Intelligence from The National Archives, Kew, Richmond, UK.

German Type U 31 submarines
U-boats commissioned in 1914
Maritime incidents in 1915
U-boats sunk in 1915
World War I submarines of Germany
World War I shipwrecks in the Atlantic Ocean
1914 ships
Ships built in Kiel